Rachel Corbett (born 11 March 1981) is an Australian podcaster, television and radio presenter, and writer. She hosts a number of podcasts, and is a weekly panelist and fill-in host for Network 10's The Project.

Career

Radio

2002–2007 
Corbett started her career in radio in 2002, co-hosting The Morning Madhouse with Steve Bedwell, James Brayshaw and Russell Gilbert on Triple M Melbourne.

She moved to the Central Coast in 2004, where she co-hosted the breakfast show on Sea FM with Paddy Gerrard.

In 2007, Corbett worked with Michael Wipfli on the breakfast show on 92.9FM in Perth, filling in for Em Rusciano while she was on maternity leave.

2009–2013 
Between 2008–2009, Corbett hosted a number of shows, including the Hot30 Countdown with Sam Mac at 2Day FM, and summer breakfast on Nova 96.9.

In 2009, Corbett was signed to Triple M Sydney, where she co-hosted The Paul Murray Show with Paul Murray. The show was renamed Paul & Rach in 2010, and moved to the breakfast slot, then the drive slot.

In 2011, Murray left Triple M, and Corbett was moved to The Grill Team. In 2011, Corbett was announced as one of the hosts of the new drive show, Merrick and the Highway Patrol, featuring Merrick Watts and Jules Schiller. This show was broadcast to over 40 Triple M stations across Australia on Southern Cross Austereo.

Television 
In 2001, Corbett appeared on the first season of Big Brother Australia. She entered the house as an intruder and was evicted four days later. Later that year, she and eight other housemates appeared on a special episode of The Weakest Link, where she was the second contestant to be voted off.

In 2011–2013, Corbett was a writer/performer on ABC2’s The Roast.

In 2014, Corbett began appearing regularly as a guest panelist and TV presenter. She has appeared on shows including Today, Paul Murray Live, The Verdict, Studio 10, The Project, Have You Been Paying Attention?, and Hughesy, We Have a Problem.

In 2015, Corbett started working on The Project on Network 10; as of 2022, she is a regular Wednesday panelist.

Podcasting 
Corbett’s first independent podcast was Paul and Rach, a podcast with her ex-radio co-host, Paul Murray. Since then, she has created a number of her own podcasts, including You’ve Gotta Start Somewhere, an interview series with Australian media personalities who share stories of getting into show business. She also hosts the PodSchool Podcast, where she shares tips for people starting their own podcasts.

In 2015, Corbett started teaching radio and podcasting at the Australian Film, Television and Radio School. In 2016, she founded PodSchool, an online podcasting course designed to help people start their own podcast.

In 2017–2020, Corbett was Head of Podcasts for Mamamia, as well as the host of a number of their shows, including Lady Startup, Before The Bump, and Sealed Section.  During her time running the network, she oversaw the development of over 20 shows, and quadrupled the audience to over 90 million downloads and over 1 million unique listeners per month. In September 2020, Corbett joined Nova Entertainment as head of podcasts and digital content.

References

External links
 
 

Living people
1981 births
Big Brother (Australian TV series) contestants
Triple M presenters
Australian television presenters
Australian women journalists
Australian journalists
People educated at the Presbyterian Ladies' College, Sydney
Australian women radio presenters
Australian women television presenters
Australian women podcasters